Platynota flavedana, the black-shaded platynota moth, is a species of moth of the family Tortricidae. It is found in the United States from Minnesota to Maine, south to North Carolina and west to Arizona.

The length of the forewings is 5-6.5 mm for males and 6-8.5 mm for females. Adults are sexually dimorphic. The forewings of the males are dark purplish brown basally and yellowish to orangish brown apically. Females have brown to orangish brown forewings with dark brown to purplish-brown markings. The hindwings of both sexes are brown to orangish brown. Adults are on wing from May to June and again from July to September. There are usually two generations per year, but a partial third generation may occur in the southern part of the range.

The larvae feed on various plants and have been recorded on Acer, Eupatorium, Helianthus, Dianthus caryophyllus, Helianthemum, Hypericum perforatum, Rhododendron, Trifolium, Sassafras, Gossypium hirsutum, Gossypium thurberi, Fragaria, Prunus persica, Rosa and Citrus species. They feed from within a shelter constructed of tied or folded leaves. Feeding may cause damage to blossoms or fruit. Full-grown larvae reach a length of 13–21 mm. They have a green to pale green body and brownish-yellow head. The species overwinters as a mid-instar larva. Pupation takes place in webbed leaves.

References

Moths described in 1875
Platynota (moth)